Mischief is an offense against property that does not involve conversion.

Mischief may also refer to:
 Mischief (1931 film), a British comedy film
 Mischief (1985 film), a teen comedy film
 Mischief (yacht), the victorious American defender of the fourth America's Cup race
 Mischief, original name of the USS Arneb, a US Navy attack cargo ship
 Mr. Mischief, a character in the Mr. Men series
 A group of rats

See also
 Mischief Reef, a reef in the Spratly Islands in the South China Sea
 Masti (2004 film) (English: Mischief), a Bollywood comedy
 Mischief Theatre, a British theatre company